Guaraciaba may refer to the following municipalities in Brazil:

Guaraciaba, Minas Gerais, in the state of Minas Gerais
Guaraciaba, Santa Catarina, in the state of Santa Catarina